Kaci Fennell-Shirley (born 9 October 1992) is Jamaican television host, model and beauty pageant titleholder who was crowned Miss Jamaica Universe 2014 and represented her country at the Miss Universe 2014 pageant.

Pageantry

Fennell was crowned Miss Universe Jamaica 2014 and represented Sandcastles on 30 August 2014. She represented her country at Miss Universe 2014. Fennell placed as the 4th runner-up to Paulina Vega of Colombia. She was the first Miss Jamaica to place since 2010 and its second Top 5 placement after 2010.

Modeling

Fennell is a model from Kingston, Jamaica. She won the Jamaica's Next Top Model contest.

Fennell has traveled to Cape Town, South Africa where she was with Base Model Agency. Fennell did a test shoot organised by INTUIT Concepts with photographer William Richards at the picturesque and fabulous Trident Castle in Portland, just days before leaving for South Africa. She is also on the cover of Nirvana Magazine 4th Edition dubbed "The Beauty Issue" making this her first ever, fashion magazine cover. For her shoot with Nirvana, Fennell's makeup artist was Romero Jennings, director of Makeup Artistry for MAC Cosmetics. She has also been featured in Buzz, SHE Caribbean, Profiles 98, The Jamaica Observer's Style Observer and the Jamaica Gleaner Flair and Outlook magazines.

References

External links
Kaci's Facebook
Miss Jamaica Official Website

Living people
Miss Universe 2014 contestants
Jamaican beauty pageant winners
People from Kingston, Jamaica
1992 births